Brian Noonan (born May 29, 1965) is an American former ice hockey right-winger.  He played for the Chicago Blackhawks, New York Rangers, Vancouver Canucks, St. Louis Blues and Phoenix Coyotes.

Originally selected in the 1983 NHL Entry Draft by the Chicago Blackhawks, Noonan played parts of seven seasons in Chicago, although during the middle part of his career with the Blackhawks he mainly saw playing time in the minors with the Indianapolis Ice. Noonan would eventually regain a roster spot with the Blackhawks, especially after Mike Keenan became head coach.  His play contributed to the team reaching the finals in 1992.

Noonan would play for Keenan again when he was traded to the New York Rangers at the trading deadline during the 1993–94 NHL season, and his play contributed to the Rangers reaching their first Stanley Cup in 54 years. Despite being credited to Mark Messier, the game-winning goal of game 7 of the 1994 Stanley Cup Finals was later shown to be scored by Noonan.

After playing two seasons with the Chicago Wolves, Noonan retired from professional play following the 2000–01 season.

Noonan played for head coach Mike Keenan on four occasions; with the Blackhawks, Rangers, Blues, and Canucks.

Noonan currently coaches hockey in Illinois. He is married and has two daughters.

Career statistics

Transactions
March 21, 1994- Traded by the Chicago Blackhawks, along with Stéphane Matteau, to the New York Rangers in exchange for Tony Amonte and Matt Oates.
July 24, 1995- Signed as a free agent with the St. Louis Blues.
November 13, 1996- Traded by the St. Louis Blues to the New York Rangers in exchange for Sergio Momesso.
March 8, 1997- Traded by the New York Rangers, along with Sergei Nemchinov, to the Vancouver Canucks in exchange for Esa Tikkanen and Russ Courtnall.
March 17, 1999- Signed as a free agent with the Phoenix Coyotes.

References

External links

Profile at hockeydraftcentral.com

1965 births
American men's ice hockey right wingers
Chicago Blackhawks draft picks
Chicago Blackhawks players
Chicago Wolves players
Indianapolis Ice players
Living people
New Westminster Bruins players
New York Rangers players
Nova Scotia Oilers players
Phoenix Coyotes players
Saginaw Generals players
Saginaw Hawks players
St. Louis Blues players
Stanley Cup champions
Vancouver Canucks players
Ice hockey people from Boston
People from South Boston